This article describes the party affiliations of the leaders of each member-state represented in the European Council during the year 2006. The list below gives the political party that each head of government, or head of state, belongs to at the national level, as well as the European political alliance to which that national party belongs. The states are listed from most to least populous. More populous states have greater influence in the council, in accordance with the system of Qualified Majority Voting.



Summary

List of leaders (1 January 2006)

 DIKO's MEP is a member of the Alliance of Liberals and Democrats for Europe group in the European Parliament, but the party is not formally attached to any pan-European organization.

Changes during the year

Affiliation

 Prodi officially aligns himself only with his The Olive Tree coalition rather than any member-party, but he was previously a member of Democracy is Freedom – The Daisy's ancestor-party and is honorary president of its European parent, the EDP.

Office-holder only

See also
Presidency of the Council of the European Union

External links
Council of the European Union (official website)

Lists of parties in the European Council